Go Saeng-geun (born 6 July 1951) is a South Korean boxer. He competed in the men's bantamweight event at the 1972 Summer Olympics.

References

1951 births
Living people
South Korean male boxers
Olympic boxers of South Korea
Boxers at the 1972 Summer Olympics
Place of birth missing (living people)
Bantamweight boxers